Salahdine Hmied (born 1 September 1961) is a Moroccan football goalkeeper who played for Morocco in the 1986 FIFA World Cup. He also played for FAR Rabat.

References

External links
FIFA profile

1961 births
Moroccan footballers
Morocco international footballers
Association football goalkeepers
AS FAR (football) players
Botola players
Olympic footballers of Morocco
Footballers at the 1984 Summer Olympics
1986 African Cup of Nations players
1986 FIFA World Cup players
Living people